Brilliant blue FCF (Blue 1) is a synthetic organic compound used primarily as a blue colorant for processed foods, medications, dietary supplements, and cosmetics. It is classified as a triarylmethane dye and is known under various names, such as FD&C Blue No. 1 or acid blue 9. It is denoted by E number E133 and has a color index of 42090. It has the appearance of a blue powder and is soluble in water and glycerol, with a maximum absorption at about 628 nanometers. It is one of the oldest FDA-approved color additives and is generally considered nontoxic and safe.

Production
Brilliant blue FCF is synthetic dye produced by the condensation of 2-formylbenzenesulfonic acid and the appropriate aniline followed by oxidation. It can be combined with tartrazine (E102) to produce various shades of green.

It is usually a disodium salt. The diammonium salt has CAS number . Calcium and potassium salts are also permitted. It can also appear as an aluminum lake. The chemical formation is C37H34N2Na2O9S3.

Related dyes are C.I. acid green 3 (CAS#4680-78-8) and acid green 9 (CAS#4857-81-2).  In these dyes, the 2-sulfonic acid group is replaced by H and Cl, respectively.

Many attempts have been made to find similarly colored natural dyes that are as stable as brilliant blue FCF. Blue pigments must possess many chemical traits, including pi-bond conjugation, aromatic rings, heteroatoms and heteroatom groups, and ionic charges in order to absorb low energy red light. Most natural blue dyes are either unstable, blue only in alkaline conditions, or toxic; good candidates for further research into use as natural dyes include anthocyanin and trichotomine derivatives. No replacement for brilliant blue FCF has been found for use in beverages.

Applications

Like many other color additives, the primary use of Blue No. 1 is to correct or enhance natural coloring or to give colorless compounds a vivid hue.

In the United States, of the two approved blue dyes (the other being Indigo carmine, or FD&C Blue #2), brilliant blue FCF is the more common of the two. As a blue color, brilliant blue FCF is often found in cotton candy, ice cream, canned processed peas, packet soups, bottled food colorings, icings, ice pops, blueberry flavored products, children's medications, dairy products, sweets soft drinks, and drinks, especially the liqueur Blue Curaçao. It is also used in soaps, shampoos, mouthwash and other hygiene and cosmetics applications.

Brilliant blue FCF is extensively used as a water tracer agent. Due to its ability to retain color for long periods of time, brilliant blue FCF outperforms other dye tracers. Additionally, brilliant blue FCF has a low toxicity level that is favorable for the environment. However, brilliant blue FCF has different impacts on varying soils. Brilliant blue FCF is attracted to and sorbed in acidic soils due to its large size and ionic charge. Soil composition and flow velocity also affect the level of sorption of brilliant blue FCF.

Brilliant blue FCF dye within beverages items—such as soda—can be used in the blue bottle experiment. In such foods, both the dye and reducing agents are incorporated in the same solution. When the solution is blue, oxygen is present. On the addition of NaOH, a reaction occurs that removes the oxygen, turning the solution clear. The dye turns back to blue once it is reoxidized by swirling the solution, incorporating oxygen from the air as an oxidizing agent.

Health and safety

The dye is poorly absorbed from the gastrointestinal tract and 95% of the ingested dye can be found in the feces.

When applied to the tongue or shaved skin, brilliant blue FCF can be absorbed directly into the bloodstream.

Due to its nontoxic properties, brilliant blue FCF has been used as a biological stain. When dissolved in an acidic medium, this dye has been used to stain cell walls, bacteria, and fungal cells. The dye does not inhibit the growth of any of these species.

For similar reasons, brilliant blue FCF is also being utilized in hemostatic medical devices, most notably the Hemopatch—designed to be placed on bleeding tissues and coagulate the blood. A low concentration of brilliant blue FCF is placed on the backside of the Hemopatch at 1 cm increments, allowing surgeons to cut precisely and indicate the side of the Hemopatch that is an active hemostatic agent for correct placement.

Brilliant blue FCF is an approved food colorant and pharmacologically inactive substance for drug formulations in the EU and the United States. It is also legal in other countries. It has the capacity for inducing allergic reactions in individuals with pre-existing moderate asthma. In 2003, the U.S. FDA issued a public health advisory to warn health care providers of the potential toxicity of this synthetic dye in enteral feeding solutions.
The following legal limits apply in the EU (E 133) and other countries: 150–300 mg/kg  depending on the type of food. Safety limit for foods and drugs: 0.1 mg/day per kg body weight.
The ADI for brilliant blue FCF is 6 mg/kg.

Biomedical research
Brilliant blue FCF and similar dyes such as brilliant blue G are inhibitors to purinergic receptors—receptors that are responsible for inflammatory responses and other cell process.

Scientists who were conducting in-vivo studies of compounds to lessen the severity of inflammation following experimental spinal cord injury had previously tested a compound called OxATP to block a key ATP receptor in spinal neurons. However, OxATP has toxic side effects and must be injected directly into the spinal cord; in searching for alternatives they noted that brilliant blue FCF has a similar structure. This led them to test a related dye, brilliant blue G (also known as Coomassie brilliant blue) in rats, which improved recovery from spinal cord injury while temporarily turning them blue.

When human washed platelets are evaluated using turbidimetry it was found that brilliant blue FCF affects platelet aggregation by blocking the Panx1 channels.  These inhibitory effects on collagen-induced shape change and maximal aggregation were shown by high (1 mM) concentrations of the dye but not by lower concentrations (100 μM).  The 1 mM effective concentration is 1.59 times greater than the approximately 0.63 mM maximal allowable brilliant blue FCF concentration according to the European Food Safety Authority.

Scientists are performing studies to better understand the effects of brilliant blue FCF during vein graft explantation. Brilliant blue FCF hinders the purinergic receptors, limiting cell proliferation that may lead to intimal hyperplasia. The effects of brilliant blue FCF were tested on rat aortic cells. It was found that brilliant blue FCF had a positive impact in limiting the development of intimal hyperplasia following a vein graft procedure.

References

Further reading

External links 
The Chemistry of Colors
Some more details, other common names
FDA Public Health Advisory on use in enteral feeding
The Feingold Diet; Dubious Benefits, Subtle Risks 

Food colorings
Triarylmethane dyes
Anilines
Benzenesulfonates
Organic sodium salts
E-number additives
Acid dyes